Une may refer to:
 Une, a town in Colombia
 Une, the chemical symbol for the element Unnilennium now known as Meitnerium

UNE can mean:
 Universidad del Noreste (University of the Northeast), Tampico, Tamaulipas, Mexico
 University of New England (Australia), in New South Wales
 University of New England (United States), in Biddeford, Maine
 Unbundled Network Element, a telecommunications regulation requirement in the United States
 Ubuntu Netbook Edition, a version of the Ubuntu operating system customized for netbook computers
 Any of a number of standards released by AENOR, the Spanish member organization of the International Organization for Standardization. A UNE or UNE-EN standard is similar to an ISO standard
 Unidad Nacional de la Esperanza (National Unity of Hope), a political party in Guatemala
 União Nacional dos Estudantes (National Union of Students), Brazilian students' union.